The 1st General Assembly of the Island of St. John represented the colony of Prince Edward Island, then known as St. John's Island, between July 7, 1773, and 1774.

The Assembly sat at the pleasure of the Governor of St. John's Island, Walter Patterson. Robert Stewart was elected Speaker. The only session lasted ten days.

References 
 Canada's Smallest Province, a history of prince edward island, ed. FWP Bolger (1973)

External links 
 Prince Edward Island, garden province of Canada, WH Crosskill (1904)

Terms of the General Assembly of Prince Edward Island
1773 establishments in Prince Edward Island
1774 disestablishments in Prince Edward Island